Oprah’s Anti-war series was a series of episodes of The Oprah Winfrey Show that ran from early November 2002 until March 18, 2003. The series was supposed to begin in the fall of 2001 but was delayed when the pilot episode inspired an enormous backlash.  Winfrey was quoted as saying:

In a September 2002 interview with Phil Donahue, Winfrey asked for advice on how one could do such shows without looking unpatriotic: “After we did a show called ‘Is War the Only Answer?’ I thought, Can’t you even ask the question without people attacking you”.  Donahue replied by saying that dissent would become easier as time passed from September 11.

Winfrey praised Donahue for plans to do anti-war shows on MSNBC, saying, “the bottom line is we need you, Phil, because we need to be challenged by the voice of dissent”, but was not yet ready to rejoin the anti-war movement herself. In the subsequent months, her position on joining the movement changed. 

Professor Daphne Read noted that in the aftermath of the attacks on the World Trade Center, The Oprah Winfrey Show, like all mainstream media, "was very closely tied to the Bush administration's response and the media rhetoric of America Under Attack, ...however, the content of Winfrey's forum began to diverge from the purely consensual, giving voice to a much wider range of views.”

Episodes

Help You Decide if You Think We Should Attack Iraq

On October 9 2002, Oprah did a show called "Help You Decide if You Think We should attack Iraq", in which she gave more time and weight to those who supported the war, and cut off an audience member who questioned if WMDs existed in Iraq. According to celebrity biographer Kitty Kelly, Oprah said weapons were "just a fact." 

An anti-war website published an activist's letter objecting to Oprah's presentation: "That show was the biggest abuse of power that I have seen on television in a long time. ... A talk show host and idol to many, you usually present an open exchange of opinions. How could you allow such an unbalanced show like that to air, when the future of the entire Planet is at stake?!"

What Does The World Think Of Us?

In early November 2002, Winfrey aired a show called “What Does The World Think Of Us?” The show challenged Americans to be skeptical about their government's foreign policy. For this, Winfrey was praised by anti-war activist Michael Moore for being the only mainstream media figure at the time to show footage of Donald Rumsfeld shaking Saddam Hussein's hand in the 1980s. Moore wrote:

Moore argued that the footage was especially important for Americans to see because the rest of the mainstream media was only showing much older footage of Jacques Chirac shaking Saddam Hussein's hand in the 1970s, seemingly to imply France opposed a war with Iraq because they were friendly with Hussein.

The World Speaks Out On Iraq

“The World Speaks Out On Iraq” was considered to be the most significant installment of Winfrey’s anti-war series, for being a two-day special aired on February 6, 2003, the day after Colin Powell's speech to the United Nations which was credited with shifting public opinion in favor of the war. 

Winfrey told her audience that it was the most important time to speak out against the war, and that she wanted to hear not just from her studio audience but from people around the world. She showed clips from citizens of Britain, France, South Africa, Iraq, and Pakistan, all urging America not to go to war. She also showed clips of Nelson Mandela and Pope John Paul II speaking out against war, and interviewed a spokesman for Patriots for Peace. Also appearing on the show were anti-war activist Jessica Mathews and columnist Thomas Friedman, who debated whether America should go to war. Mathews pointed out that Saddam Hussein had no connections to al-Qaeda. While Friedman supported war only if America could get international support, he conceded that Hussein was not a security threat to America. At the end of the two-day show, Winfrey sided with Mathews, agreeing that the case for war was not convincing enough, considering the consequences.

During part one of the show, a press conference held by George W. Bush and Colin Powell interrupted the show in many markets. An article in Buzzflash.com claimed the press conference was a deliberate attempt to silence debate:

An article from Academics for Justice drew the same conclusion:

What You Should Know About Iraq

On March 6, 2003 Winfrey did a show called “What You Should Know About Iraq,” in which Middle East expert Fawaz Gerges described the suffering of the Iraqi people since Operation Desert Storm. Gerges argued that the desire of the Bush administration to overthrow Saddam Hussein would have a devastating effect on the Iraqi people. Dan Rather also talked about his interview with Hussein, in which Hussein was apparently curious about George W. Bush and the will of the American people to attack Iraq. The guests on the show explained that the United States had worked with several dictators in the past and actively aided Hussein during the administration of Ronald Reagan to keep the Islamic fundamentalist movement in Iran from spreading. On Oprah After The Show (aired on Winfrey's cable network Oxygen (now owned by NBC Universal)), Gerges urged Winfrey's audience not to believe reports linking Saddam Hussein to the September 11th attacks, reports which Winfrey condemned as "propaganda."

Anti-Americanism – Why Do So Many Dislike the U.S.?

“Anti-Americanism - Why Do So Many Dislike the U.S.?” was the final installment in Winfrey's anti-war series. It aired on March 18, in the immediate aftermath of Bush’s 48-hour speech and just two days before the war began. The show explored whether, if America won a war with Iraq, it might lose something bigger. 

The show was strongly condemned by proponents of the war like Townhall.com’s Ben Shapiro, who criticized Winfrey for only including anti-Bush guests such as the anti-war Fawaz Gerges and Thomas Friedman. He also criticized Winfrey for showing bias during the show:

Steve Perry of Minneapolis/St. Paul City Pages praised the show, writing:

Also praising the show for its "amazing perspective" was The Globe and Mails television critic John Doyle, who noted that "at a time when the consensus in American television is that everybody should pull together and support the men and women in the U.S. military, what Oprah Winfrey did was outright subversion." 

Gerges told Winfrey’s audience that although war was very imminent, he felt a responsibility to express his dissent right up to the last minute. 

A few months after the show aired, anti-war activist Michael Moore publicly begged Winfrey to run for president.

References

Opposition to the Iraq War
Iraq War and the media
Oprah Winfrey